The 2006 Akron Zips football team represented the University of Akron in the 2006 NCAA Division I FBS football season. Akron competed as a member of the East Division of the Mid-American Conference (MAC). The Zips were led by J. D. Brookhart in his third year as head coach.

Schedule

References

Akron
Akron Zips football seasons
Akron Zips football